Mohamed Kherrazi (born 29 June 1990) is a Dutch professional basketball player of Moroccan descent who plays for Leuven Bears of the BNXT League. He is also a member of the Dutch national basketball team. He is a record three-time DBL Defensive Player of the Year winner.

Early life 
Kherrazi was born and grew up in Errachidia, where he started playing basketball with his brothers. They watched videos on their father's old computer and trained themselves. At age 12, his family moved to the Netherlands.

Professional career
In his first professional season with ABC Amsterdam Kherrazi was named the DBL Rookie of the Year. In 2011, he signed with Zorg en Zekerheid Leiden. In the 2014–15 season, Kherrazi was named the DBL Defensive Player of the Year. In 2019, Kherrazi won his third Defensive Player award, which was a new record.

On 12 August 2019, Kherrazi signed with Landstede Zwolle.

On 1 October 2020, Kherrazi signed with Feyenoord Basketball. On 1 December, Feyenoord announced Kherrazi had extended his contract until 2022 but will play temporarily for Kangoeroes Mechelen in Belgium. Because the DBL season had been suspended due to the COVID-19 pandemic, Kherrazi continued with Kangoeroes. On 27 August 2021, Kherrazi and Feyenoord parted ways.

On 28 August 2021, Kherrazi signed a two-year contract with Heroes Den Bosch. In his first season with Heroes, Kherrazi won his second national championship. On 21 September 2022, Kherrazi and Den Bosch agreed to terminate his contract.

On December 2, 2022, he signed with Leuven Bears of the BNXT League.

International career
Kherrazi made his debut for the Netherlands national basketball team in 2014, during the qualification rounds for EuroBasket 2015. With the Netherlands, Kherrazi qualified for EuroBasket 2015, which was the first continental tournament for the Dutch in 25 years.

At EuroBasket 2015, Kherrazi averaged 5.2 points and 4.3 rebounds per game, helping the Netherlands to a 1–4 record. Seven years later, he played at EuroBasket 2022, where he averaged 5.4 points and 3.4 rebounds as a starter. The Netherlands were winless at the tournament, finishing 0–5.

Honours

Club
ZZ Leiden
2× Dutch Basketball League: (2013, 2022)
2× Dutch Cup: (2012, 2019)
2× Dutch Supercup: (2011, 2012)
Landstede Hammers
Dutch Supercup: (2019)

Individual awards
DBL Rookie of the Year: (2010)
3× DBL Defensive Player of the Year: (2015, 2016, 2019)
5× DBL All-Defense Team (2015, 2016, 2017, 2018, 2019)

Player profile

Kherrazi is known as a good defender and solid rebounder. He usually plays as power forward but is occasionally used as small forward.

Personal
His brother, Hicham, is also a professional player and has played for Apollo Amsterdam and Aris Leeuwarden.

In 2020, the short film Kherrazi 11:11, about his life, was released.

References

External links

1990 births
Living people
Amsterdam Basketball players
Feyenoord Basketball players
B.S. Leiden players
Dutch Basketball League players
Kangoeroes Basket Mechelen players
Dutch men's basketball players
Heroes Den Bosch players
Landstede Hammers players
Leuven Bears players
Moroccan emigrants to the Netherlands
People from Errachidia
Power forwards (basketball)
Dutch expatriate basketball people in Belgium
Moroccan men's basketball players